C. Ramprasad is an Indian director of photography who works predominantly in the Telugu film industry. He has done cinematography for more than 50 films. He has worked as the cinematographer for some of the greatest hits in Telugu cinema, like Hanuman Junction (2001), Murari (2002), Athanokkade (2005), Maryada Ramanna (2010), Mirapakay (2011), Yevadu (2014), Legend (2014), and Akhanda (2021).

Early life

C. Ramprasad was born to the couple Sri C. Madhav Rao and Smt. Subbalakshmi in 1965. His father Sri C. Madhav Rao is a makeup man in South India and mother a housewife. He spent his earlier years in Chennai where his father was working as a makeup man. While his father inspired Ram Prasad to make a decision about his career and it was the film industry that supported his decision of joining the industry. After completing his SSLC, he joined the Film Institute in Chennai to pursue a Diploma in Cinematography (D.F.T.-Diploma in Film Technology). His passion for photography was so much that he just dropped out of college to join as the assistant of Late VSR Swamy.

Career

C. Ram Prasad worked as assistant cameraman in Telugu feature films from 1986 to 1988, as associate cameraman from 1989 to 1993 and finally he got his first break in the film Pacha Thoranam.

Awards

Filmography

References

External links
 
 

Living people
Telugu film cinematographers
20th-century Indian photographers
1966 births
21st-century Indian photographers
Santosham Film Awards winners